The 2014–15 season was the 106th season in Levante’s history and the 10th in the top-tier.

Squad statistics

Appearances and goals

|-
! colspan=10 style=background:#dcdcdc; text-align:center|Goalkeepers

|-
! colspan=10 style=background:#dcdcdc; text-align:center|Defenders

|-
! colspan=10 style=background:#dcdcdc; text-align:center|Midfielders

|-
! colspan=10 style=background:#dcdcdc; text-align:center|Forwards

|-
! colspan=10 style=background:#dcdcdc; text-align:center| Players who have made an appearance or had a squad number this season but have been loaned out or transferred

Transfer in

Transfer out

Competitions

Overall

Friendlies

Primera División

League table

Results summary

Matches
Kickoff times are in CET and CEST.

Copa del Rey

References

Levante UD seasons
Levante UD